Surami Synagogue  is a synagogue in Surami, Georgia.

History
The synagogue was built in 1915. It is off the beaten path of tourists, but serves the local community. It has been a place of refuge during persecutions.

Notes

Further reading

Synagogues in Georgia (country)
Buildings and structures in Shida Kartli